The Weather Company is a weather forecasting and information technology company that owns and operates weather.com (the website for The Weather Channel), and Weather Underground. The Weather Company has been a subsidiary of the Watson & Cloud Platform business unit of IBM since 2016.

History and operations
The Weather Company started as the Weather Channel in 1980, and launched two years later. In 2012, the company created a broader holding company and replaced the word "Channel" with "Company" to better reflect their growing lineup of digital products.

The Weather Company was previously owned by a consortium made up of the Blackstone Group, Bain Capital, and NBCUniversal. That consortium sold the Weather Company's product and technology assets to IBM on January 29, 2016, but retained possession of The Weather Channel cable network until March 2018, when it was sold to Entertainment Studios. As part of the 2016 spin-off, the consortium entered into a long-term licensing agreement with IBM for use of its weather data and "The Weather Channel" name and branding.

See also
 List of mergers and acquisitions by IBM
 List of meteorology institutions

References

External links
 

Companies established in 1982
Companies based in Atlanta
IBM acquisitions
IBM subsidiaries
Meteorological companies
The Weather Channel
Former General Electric subsidiaries
Former Comcast subsidiaries
2016 mergers and acquisitions